The Tourist is a 1925 American silent comedy film directed by Fatty Arbuckle.

Cast
 Johnny Arthur as The Tourist
 Helen Foster as Helen, The Girl
 Joy Winthrop as Helen's Mother
 Glen Cavender as First Crook
 George Davis as Second Crook

See also
 Fatty Arbuckle filmography

References

External links

1925 films
1925 comedy films
1925 short films
American black-and-white films
Films directed by Roscoe Arbuckle
American silent short films
Silent American comedy films
American comedy short films
1920s American films